In mathematics, three different functions are known as the pi or Pi function:

  (pi function) – the prime-counting function
  (Pi function) – the gamma function when offset to coincide with the factorial
 Rectangular function
You might also be looking for:

  – the Infinite product of a sequence
Capital pi notation